The subfamily Microdontinae contains slightly more than 400 species of hoverflies (family Syrphidae) and, while diverse, these species share several characteristics by which they differ from other syrphids. The Microdontinae are myrmecophiles, meaning they live in the nests of ants. Larval Microdontinae are scavengers or predators in ant nests, and, in contrast to other syrphid larvae, have no readily apparent body segmentation. Some species also do not exhibit the typical adult flower-visiting behaviour of other hoverflies, but instead remain near their larval host colonies (some of these species have no functional mouthparts and cannot feed as adults).

A number of genera (e.g. Masarygus, Paragodon, Schizoceratomyia and Surimyia) lack the "spurious vein" which is characteristic of all other Syrphidae. For other distinguishing characteristics, see Thompson (1969).

Genera
A revised list of the genera in Microdontinae was carried out by Reemer & Ståhls (2013):

Afromicrodon Thompson, 2008
Archimicrodon Hull, 1945
Archimicrodon Hull, 1945
Hovamicrodon Keiser, 1971
Aristosyrphus Curran, 1941
Aristosyrphus Curran, 1941
Eurypterosyrphus Barretto & Lane, 1947
Bardistopus Mann, 1920
Carreramyia Doesburg, 1966
Ceratophya Wiedemann, 1824
Ceratrichomyia Séguy, 1951
Ceriomicrodon Hull, 1937
Cervicorniphora Hull, 1945
Chrysidimyia Hull, 1937
Domodon Reemer, 2013
Furcantenna Cheng, 2008
Heliodon Reemer, 2013
Hypselosyrphus Hull, 1937
Indascia Keiser, 1958
Kryptopyga Hull, 1944
Laetodon Reemer, 2013
Masarygus Bréthes, 1909
Menidon Reemer, 2013
Mermerizon Reemer, 2013
Metadon Reemer, 2013
Microdon Meigen, 1803
Chymophila Macquart, 1834
Dimeraspis Newman, 1838
Megodon Keiser, 1971
Microdon Meigen, 1803
Myiacerapis Hull, 1949
Syrphipogon Hull, 1937
Mixogaster Macquart, 1842
Oligeriops Hull, 1937
Omegasyrphus Giglio-Tos, 1891
Paragodon Thompson, 1969
Paramicrodon de Meijere, 1913
Paramixogaster Brunetti, 1923
Parocyptamus Shiraki, 1930
Peradon Reemer, 2013
Piruwa Reemer, 2013
Pseudomicrodon Hull, 1937
Ptilobactrum Bezzi, 1915
Rhoga Walker, 1857
Rhopalosyrphus Giglio-Tos, 1891
Schizoceratomyia Carrera, Lopes & Lane, 1947
Serichlamys Curran, 1925
Spheginobaccha de Meijere, 1908
Stipomorpha Hull, 1945
Sulcodon Reemer, 2013
Surimyia Reemer, 2008
Thompsodon Reemer, 2013
Ubristes Walker, 1852

References

Further reading

External links

 
Myrmecology
Taxa named by Camillo Rondani
Brachycera subfamilies